Steve Perillo (born September 29, 1955) is the president and owner of Perillo Tours, having taken over from his father, Mario Perillo, "Mr. Italy", and represents the 3rd generation of the 75-year-old family business. He is sometimes referred to as "Mr. Italy, Jr." as a reference to his father's famous nickname.

Following in his father's footsteps of direct pitch TV ads for travel, his well known commercials have been parodied by Adam Sandler on Saturday Night Live.

In addition to running his travel business, he is also a published composer of classical music

References

Living people
1955 births
American businesspeople
People from New Jersey
People from Saddle River, New Jersey
American people of Italian descent
Centaur Records artists